Killanena is a townland and formerly a district electoral division (DED) in County Clare, Ireland, in the Catholic parish of Killanena.

Location
At  it is the largest lake in East Clare after Lough Derg.
The lake is well known for its coarse fishery, with pike, perch, bream, rudd and eel.
The lake is the home or resting place for water-fowl and wading birds that include whooper swan, great crested grebe, grey heron and greater white-fronted goose.
The village of Flagmount overlooks the lake. It is called Leacain an Éadain in Irish, or "the slope of the (hill)brow".
The poet Brian Merriman was a local hedge-school master. There is a commemorative stone to him at Bunshoon Bridge between Flagmount and Caher.

Townlands
As of 1901 the Killanena DED included the townlands of Acres, Corbehagh,  Derreendooagh,  Derrycarran,  Derryfadda,  Derrynaveagh,  Dooglaun,  Doorus East,  Doorus West, Gortaveha, Gortnamuinga, Islandmore, Killanena, Knockanena, Knockatunna, Knocknageeha, Knocknahannee, Lannaght, Pollaghanumera, Reanahumana, Scalp and Spaightspark.

Parish
There was no village, but about four shops. Although it did not have electricity, gas or public water or sewage supply at the time, it had plentiful fine wells.
The parish of Killanena is in the Roman Catholic Diocese of Killaloe. There are two parish churches, St Mary's in Flagmount and St Mary's in Killanena.

References

Townlands of County Clare
Parishes of the Roman Catholic Diocese of Killaloe